FC Nöttingen is a German association football club from the Nöttingen district of Remchingen, Baden-Württemberg. The footballers are part of a sports club of more than 500 members that also has departments for table tennis and an unusual sport popular locally known as Schnürles or Fussballtennis (en:football-tennis), played with a soccer ball on a tennis court. The game was introduced to the area from Czechoslovakia in the 1920s by coach Fritz Schnürle. The stadium is the Kleiner Arena.



History
Founded on 2 July 1957, FC acknowledges TSV Germania Nöttingen, established prior to World War I, as a predecessor side. Germania folded in 1927.

The modern day successor rose slowly and steadily, out of B-class football into A-class in 1969, on into the Bezirksliga Pforzheim in 1972, the Landesliga Mittelbaden in 1996, the Verbandsliga Nordbaden (V) in 1997, and the Oberliga Baden-Württemberg (IV) in 2002. On reaching the Regionalliga Süd (III) in 2004 FC stumbled and was relegated after finishing in last place. The club currently plays in the fifth tier Oberliga Baden-Württemberg as a lower table side.

In 2010–11, the club lead the Oberliga for most of the season, but eventually missed out on the title and promotion to Waldhof Mannheim when it lost the last two games of the season. A third-place finish in the Oberliga qualified the club for the promotion play-offs to the Regionalliga Südwest, where it defeated FSV Salmrohr and earned promotion. After only one season in the Regionalliga the club was relegated to the Oberliga again in 2015. Finishing runners-up in the Oberliga in 2015–16 Nöttingen was once more promoted to the Regionalliga after a play-off after four-all draw with SC Hauenstein in the final match.

Honours
The club's honours:

League
 Oberliga Baden-Württemberg
 Champions: 2004
 Runners-up: 2011, 2016
 Verbandsliga Nordbaden (V)
 Champions: 2002
 Landesliga Mittelbaden (VI)
 Champions: 1997
 Bezirksliga Pforzheim
 Champions: 1979, 1982, 1986, 1996
 A-Klass Süd
 Champions: 1972
 B-Klass Nord
 Champions: 1969

Cup
 North Baden Cup
 Winners: 2012, 2015, 2017
 Runners-up: 2010, 2011, 2013, 2014, 2020

The club's second team also captured the Berzirksliga title in 2004.

League timeline

Recent managers
Recent managers of the club:

Recent seasons
The recent season-by-season performance of the club:

 With the introduction of the Regionalligas in 1994 and the 3. Liga in 2008 as the new third tier, below the 2. Bundesliga, all leagues below dropped one tier.

References

External links
Official team site
Das deutsche Fußball-Archiv historical German domestic league tables 
FC Nöttingen at Weltfussball.de

Football clubs in Germany
Football clubs in Baden-Württemberg
Association football clubs established in 1957
1957 establishments in West Germany
Remchingen
FC Nöttingen